The Georgetown Hoyas men's basketball program represents Georgetown University in NCAA Division I men's intercollegiate basketball and the Big East Conference.  Georgetown has competed in men's college basketball since 1907.  The current head coach of the program is Ed Cooley.

Georgetown won the National Championship in 1984 and has made the Final Four on five occasions.  They have won the Big East Conference tournament a record eight times, and have also won or shared the Big East regular season title ten times. They have appeared in the NCAA tournament 31 times and in the National Invitation Tournament 13 times.

The Hoyas historically have been well regarded not only for their team success, but also for generating players that have succeeded both on and off the court, producing NBA legends such as Patrick Ewing, Dikembe Mutombo, Alonzo Mourning, and Allen Iverson, as well as United States Congressman Henry Hyde and former NFL Commissioner Paul Tagliabue.  A total of 7 former Hoya players or coaches are members of the Basketball Hall of Fame.

History

Early years (1907–1943)
Founded in the fall of 1906, the Georgetown men's basketball team played its first game on February 9, 1907, defeating the University of Virginia by a score of 22–11. In its first 60-some years, the program displayed only sporadic success. Until McDonough Gymnasium opened on campus for the 1950–51 season, the team changed home courts frequently, playing on campus at Ryan Gymnasium and off campus at McKinley Technology High School, Uline Arena, and the National Guard Armory, as well as playing individual home games at the University of Maryland's Ritchie Coliseum and The Catholic University of America's Brookland Gymnasium, among others. The downtown locations of these venues was also influenced by the number of Law School students who played on the team in this era. From 1918 through 1923, while on campus at Ryan Gymnasium, Georgetown managed a 52–0 home record under coach John O'Reilly. A large on-campus arena was proposed in 1927, but it was shelved during the Great Depression.

The team recruited its first All-American, Ed Hargaden, in 1931. From 1932 until 1939, the Hoyas played in the Eastern Intercollegiate Conference, and they were regular-season conference co-champions in 1939. In 1942, a Hoya went pro for the first time, when three seniors, Al Lujack, Buddy O'Grady, and Dino Martin, were drafted professionally upon graduation.

The next year the team, led by future congressman Henry Hyde, reached new heights and posted its first 20-win season ever, going 22–5 on the year.  This success translated into a berth into the 1943 NCAA tournament, the school's first postseason appearance.  Taking advantage of the opportunity, the Hoyas made it all the way to the National Championship game, where they ultimately lost to Wyoming. Georgetown's coach of this squad, Elmer Ripley, was later inducted into the Basketball Hall of Fame in 1973.

World War II and the lean years (1943–1972)

Coming off of the best season in school history, momentum was stalled as the program was suspended from 1943 to 1945 because of World War II.  Following the hiatus the program struggled to find its footing, and it was rarely successful over the next three decades, only making two postseason appearances during this time period.

In 1953, former Baltimore Bullets player Buddy Jeannette coached the team to its first National Invitation Tournament invitation, but the team lost in the first round to Louisville. Top players from this period include Tom O'Keefe, the first Hoya to reach 1,000 career points in 1949–50, and future National Football League Commissioner Paul Tagliabue, who graduated second in Hoya career rebounds in 1962. O'Keefe returned to coach the team from 1960 until 1966.  In 1966 the school hired John "Jack" Magee, who had led Boston College as a player to its first NCAA Tournament bid. Magee had some relative success early on, as he led the team to the 1970 NIT, just its third post-season appearance ever.  However, the team lost to LSU in the first round. A losing season the subsequent year, followed up with a three-win season in 1971–72, the worst in school history, ultimately led to his dismissal. This was the last time a Hoyas head coach suffered back-to-back losing seasons for over 35 years.

John Thompson Jr. era (1972–1999)

John Thompson Jr., played two seasons with the Boston Celtics before he achieved local notability coaching St. Anthony's High School in Washington, D.C. to several very successful seasons. Thompson was hired to coach Georgetown in 1972, and with recruits from St. Anthony's like Merlin Wilson, quickly and dramatically improved the team. Georgetown, while still independent, participated in the Eastern College Athletic Conference′s 1975 postseason ECAC South tournament, and after a 16–9 regular season found itself facing West Virginia in the conference tournament championship. Derrick Jackson's buzzer beater won Georgetown its first tournament championship, and a bid to the 1975 NCAA tournament. Georgetown repeated as ECAC South tournament champions the following year, beating George Washington University when Craig Esherick's buzzer beater sent the game to overtime, and as ECAC South-Upstate Tournament champions in the 1978-79 season, beating Syracuse University in Jim Boeheim's first game against the Hoyas as Syracuse's coach.

Prior to the 1979–80 season, Georgetown joined with six other schools, Providence, St. John's, Syracuse, Seton Hall, Connecticut, and Boston College to found a conference focused primarily on basketball. The Big East Conference provided Georgetown increased competition, and several of its longest rivalries. On February 13, 1980, in the final game at Manley Field House, Georgetown star Sleepy Floyd scored two last-second free-throws to snap No. 3 Syracuse's 57 game home winning streak, leading Coach Thompson to declare "Manley Field House is officially closed." They faced Syracuse again three weeks later in the first Big East tournament finals, winning 87–81. In the 1980 NCAA tournament, the team advanced to the Elite Eight, where they fell to the Iowa Hawkeyes on a last second foul call.

The team moved its home arena in the 1981-82 season to the Capital Centre in Landover, Maryland to accommodate its growing fan base.  It also marked the arrival of heralded recruit, Patrick Ewing, who became one of the first college players to start and star on a varsity team as a freshman.  That year, Ewing led the Hoyas to their second Big East tournament title in school history, and a No. 1 seed in the NCAA tournament.  In the tournament, the Hoyas advanced to their first Final Four since 1943, where they defeated the University of Louisville 50–46, to set up a showdown in the NCAA Final against the University of North Carolina.  In one of the most star-studded championship games in NCAA history, Ewing was called for goaltending five times in the first half (later revealed to be intentional at the behest of coach Thompson), setting the tone for the Hoyas and making his presence felt. The Hoyas led by one point late in the game, but a jumpshot by future NBA superstar Michael Jordan gave North Carolina the lead. Georgetown still had a chance at winning the game in the final seconds, but Freddy Brown mistakenly threw a bad pass directly to opposing player James Worthy, and North Carolina won 63–62.

For the 1982-83 season, Georgetown began the season as the No. 2 ranked team in the country.  The early season included a highly anticipated matchup with No. 1 Virginia, and highly regarded center Ralph Sampson.  Arenas nationwide jockeyed to host the matchup but Georgetown insisted on hosting it at the Capital Centre.  WTBS won the rights to broadcast the game with a $550,000 bid, and it was billed as the "Game of the Decade".  It became the first major college sports event telecasted exclusively on cable television. In the game, held on December 11, 1982, Virginias veteran team won, 68–63. The Hoyas went on to post a 22–10 record for the season and made another NCAA Tournament appearance, but were defeated in the second round of the tournament by Memphis State.  This was the only season in Ewing's four-year Georgetown career where the team did not make it as least as far as the National Championship game.

In the 1983-84 season Georgetown again won the Big East conference regular season title, and faced Syracuse for the Big East tournament championship.  In a physical and tightly contested contest, Georgetown won 82–71 in overtime, securing their third tournament title in the first five years of the newly formed conference.  In the NCAA tournament, the No. 1 seeded Hoyas ultimately advanced to the Final Four for the third time in school history to face Kentucky, a team which had never lost a national semifinal game and was led by the "Twin Towers," Sam Bowie and Melvin Turpin. Georgetown was able to turn an early 12 point deficit into a 53–40 win to advance to the National Championship game. In the final, the Hoyas faced the University of Houston and future Hall of Fame center Hakeem Olajuwon, who were making their second straight National Championship game appearance.  Georgetown led comfortably throughout the final, and went on to an 84–75 victory, giving the school its first NCAA Championship in school history.  Ewing was named the tournament's Most Outstanding Player, while Thompson became the first African American coach to win an NCAA Division I title.  Freddy Brown, who made the key turnover in the title game two years prior, was given the chance to raise the trophy first.

To begin the 1984-85 season, the defending champions opened the season as the No. 1 ranked team and won their first 18 games.  On January 26, 1985, the St. John's University Redmen snapped the Hoyas' 29 game win streak (dating back to the prior season), in what was the first of an unprecedented four contests this season.  Their next meeting on February 27, 1985, was one of the most anticipated games in college basketball history, with Georgetown and St. John's ranked No. 2 and No. 1 respectively.  Coach Thompson entered Madison Square Garden wearing a shirt under his blazer in the same sweater pattern as St. John's coach Lou Carnesecca, and as a result the game became known as "the sweater game."  The Hoyas easily won the game 85–69, and then defeated the Redmen again just a few weeks later in the 1985 Big East tournament finals, capturing their fourth title in six years.  The teams met one more time, after both advanced to the Final Four in the NCAA tournament.  Again No. 1 Georgetown was victorious, easily handling St. John's 77–59.  In the title game the Hoyas found themselves matched up with another conference rival in Villanova, whom they had beaten twice that season.  An overwhelming favorite going into the game, Georgetown was upset by the Wildcats 66–64, who shot a record 78.6 percent (22 of 28) from the floor, denying Georgetown back-to-back titles. Ewing graduated, having helped his team to a 121–23 record in his four years, and was the first player in school history to be drafted with the first overall pick.

Following the enormous heights of Ewing's four-year run, the program continued its success in the years that followed.  Senior Reggie Williams led the Hoyas to both Big East regular season and tournament championships in the 1986–87 season. Freshman Alonzo Mourning and sophomore Dikembe Mutombo helped win both titles in the 1988–89 season. Mourning and Mutombo were both excellent shot blockers; Mourning led the nation in 1988–89, and fans created a "Rejection Row" section under the basket. They repeated both championships in the 1989–90 season and won the regular season title in the 1991-92 season.

In the 1994–95 season, newcomer Allen Iverson won the Big East Rookie of the Year award. During his two years at Georgetown, Iverson scored a Georgetown-record 22.9 points per game. In 1995–96, he propelled the Hoyas to a major upset over the Connecticut Huskies during the season, but Georgetown later lost to the Huskies in the final seconds of that year's Big East tournament.  In the NCAA tournament, the Hoyas came up one game short of the Final Four, losing to the University of Massachusetts, the top ranked team in the country.

In the 1996–97 season, with an 11–7 conference record, the Hoyas won the regular season Big East 7 Division title for the second year in a row, but fell in the first round of the 1997 NCAA tournament. In December 1997, just after the beginning of the 1997-98 season, the team moved back into Washington, D.C. with the construction of a new arena, the Verizon Center (originally MCI Center), in Chinatown. The 1997-98 campaign ended in an overtime loss to Georgia Tech in the NIT.

Thompson retired abruptly in the midst of the 1998–99 season on January 8, 1999, citing marriage problems, and was replaced by his assistant Craig Esherick. Under Thompson, 26 players were chosen in the NBA draft, eight in the first round, including two players selected first overall; Ewing by the New York Knicks in 1985 and Iverson by the Philadelphia 76ers in 1996. Over his 26½ seasons, Thompson's Hoyas went an impressive 596–239 (.714), running off a streak of 24 postseason appearances with 20 in the NCAA tournament and four in the NIT.  He was honored as the National Coach of the Year three times during his career at Georgetown, and was inducted into the Basketball Hall of Fame in 1999.

Craig Esherick era (1999–2004)
Craig Esherick coached the Georgetown Hoyas basketball squad from January 1999 to March 2004. Esherick was a four-year player for the men's basketball team from 1974 to 1978 and then the lead assistant coach under John Thompson Jr. from 1981 to 1999. The team finished with a 15–15 record in his first season – going 8–10 after Thompson resigned and Esherick took over –before losing to Princeton in the first round of the 1999 NIT. They improved in 1999-2000, going 19–15 and accepting an invitation to the 2000 NIT. After winning the first-round game in triple overtime over Virginia, the Hoyas lost in the second-round game to California.

In 2000–01, led by future top NBA Draft pick Michael Sweetney, they made the NCAA tournament after finishing 23–7 in the regular season. In the opening round of the NCAA tournament the 7th-seeded Hoyas advanced past 10th-seeded Arkansas on a game-winning shot at the buzzer by Nat Burton. The Hoyas subsequently beat Hampton, and then lost to third-seeded Maryland in the Sweet Sixteen.

In 2001–02, the Hoyas went 19–11, barely missing an NCAA tournament bid. The team rejected a bid to the 2002 NIT bid because of travel-arrangement issues associated with the players' ability to attend classes, resulting in their first season without a postseason tournament since 1973-74. In 2002-03, the Hoyas finished the regular season with a 19–15 record, and accepted a bid to the 2003 NIT, where they made it to the final but lost to Big East rival St. John's. Sweetney was named a second-team All-American and was drafted with the ninth pick in the 2002 NBA draft by the New York Knicks.

In Esherick's final season, 2003–04, the Hoyas struggled to a 13–15 overall record and a dismal 4–12 Big East record, and for the first time since the 1973–74 season received no invitation to either the NCAA tournament or the NIT. The 13 wins were the team's fewest since the 1973–74 season and Esherick was fired after 5½ seasons as head coach on March 15, 2004, five days after an opening-round loss in the Big East tournament to Boston College. He had posted a 103–74 (.597) record during his tenure as head coach. Georgetown began a national search for a new coach after Esherick's firing that resulted in the hiring of John Thompson III.

John Thompson III era (2004–2017)

On April 21, 2004, John Thompson III was selected as the head coach of the Hoyas. The son of the legendary Hoyas coach took over the position after over a decade at Princeton University. The younger Thompson was a player for the Tigers from 1984 to 1988, was an assistant coach at Princeton from 1995 to 2000, and then took over as head coach at Princeton until his move to the Hoyas. Thompson's head coaching stint at Princeton was marked with success as he led the Tigers to three Ivy League titles, two NCAA Tournament appearances and one NIT appearance.

Thompson brought with him an adaptation of the Princeton offense as an offensive philosophy to Georgetown. He had learned it under the tutelage of legendary coach Pete Carril at Princeton and began to adjust the strategy to the more athletic players he would be coaching at Georgetown. Thompson III also immediately brought two new assistant coaches to Georgetown in Robert Burke and Kevin Broadus.

Thompson inherited three players that Esherick had recruited: Jeff Green, Roy Hibbert, Tyler Crawford and RaMell Ross. He also brought with him a former Princeton recruit, Jonathan Wallace and saw the return of two major contributors from the previous Georgetown team in Brandon Bowman, Ashanti Cook, and Darrel Owens. John Thompson III's first notable win with the team took place on January 21, 2006, in the 16th game of the 2005–06 season, when unranked Georgetown upset No. 1 Duke. This was Georgetown's first win over a No. 1 ranked team in 21 years.

The 2006–07 season marked the centennial of Hoya hoops, which was celebrated by honoring some of the team's most famous alumni at the Georgetown-Marquette game on February 10, 2007. Led by juniors Green, Hibbert, Wallace, Patrick Ewing Jr., the son of the Georgetown player from the elder Thompson era, the Hoyas won their first regular-season Big East Championship since 1992 and defeated Pittsburgh to win their first Big East tournament championship since 1989. Jeff Green was named the Big East Player of the Year and the tournament's Most Outstanding Player. In the NCAA tournament, the Hoyas beat North Carolina in the Regional Final when their defense caused North Carolina to suffer an improbable collapse in which UNC missed 22 of their final 23 field goal attempts. The Hoyas then advanced to the Final Four where they fell to an Ohio State team led by Greg Oden.

The 2007–08 Hoyas finished with a regular season record of 27–5, and again won the conference regular season title. They lost to Pittsburgh in the Big East tournament championship game. They received a No. 2 seed in the NCAA tournament, where they lost their second-round game. After the season, Roy Hibbert, Jonathan Wallace, and Patrick Ewing Jr. all graduated, while Vernon Macklin and Jeremiah Rivers both transferred from the school.

The Hoyas began their 2008–09 season ranked No. 22 AP/No. 18 Coaches, however, college basketball's toughest strength of schedule eventually wore down a team that was also one of the youngest. The Hoyas were 7–11 in Big East play for a 12th-place finish, followed by a first-round loss in the Big East tournament. The Hoyas accepted a bid to the NIT, but lost in the first round to Baylor.

In 2009–10, the team finished the season 23–11, and 10–8 in Big East play. They advanced to the championship game of the Big East tournament before losing to West Virginia. They received an at–large bid to the NCAA tournament, earning a No. 3 seed in the Midwest Region, where they were upset by No. 14 seed Ohio in the first round. Greg Monroe entered the NBA draft as a sophomore and was selected by the Detroit Pistons.

The 2010–11 team was led by Austin Freeman and Chris Wright. The team scored multiple early wins over ranked teams, including an overtime win at No. 9 Missouri, but their stumbles at the end of the season coincided with Wright breaking his hand and missing three games. The team received an at-large bid as a No. 6 seed, but lost in their first game of the NCAA tournament to No. 11-seeded and eventual Final Four participant VCU.

Prior to the 2011–12 season, the Hoyas made a goodwill trip to China for several matches with local teams. U.S. Vice President Joe Biden attended their first game, a win over the Shanxi Zhongyu Brave Dragons. Their second game against the Bayi Rockets, however, ended in a brawl, causing the team to leave the court while Chinese fans threw garbage and debris. Georgetown won its final games, against the Liaoning Dinosaurs and the Taiwanese national team without incident. The Hoyas finished the season in fourth place in the Big East and received a bid to the NCAA tournament as a No. 3 seed in the Midwest. After a win in the second round, they were upset by No. 11-seeded NC State.

The 2012–13 season saw the Hoyas as the top overall seed in the Big East tournament based on a tiebreaker, but lost in the semifinals. Georgetown received a bid as a No. 2 seed in the South bracket in the NCAA tournament, facing tournament newcomer Florida Gulf Coast University in the second round. Georgetown lost to the 15th-seeded Eagles 78–68, the seventh number two seed to lose to a 15 seed. It was the fourth consecutive season the Hoyas were eliminated by a double-digit seed in the NCAA tournament.

The 2013–14 season was the team's first after Georgetown and six other schools left the original Big East Conference and joined Butler, Creighton, and Xavier in forming the new Big East Conference – part of a major conference realignment in which several other teams moved to the Atlantic Coast Conference from the old Big East and the old Big East became the American Athletic Conference. Like the previous year, the 2013–14 season started abroad, with the Hoyas playing in the Armed Forces Classic at Camp Humphreys near Pyeongtaek, South Korea. After a 17–13 regular-season record followed by an upset in the first round of the Big East tournament at the hands of last-place DePaul, the team received a No. 4 seed in the NIT, losing in the second round to top-seeded Florida State.

In 2014–15, the Hoyas rebounded from their previous season's performance. Ranked as high as No. 21 at times, they completed the regular season with a 20–7 record and a second-place finish in the Big East, and advanced to the semifinals of the Big East tournament before losing to Xavier. Ranked No. 22 in the country, they received a No. 4 seed in the NCAA tournament, but lost to Utah in the third round.

The Hoyas under Thompson III struggled for the next two years. They began their 2015–16 season with a four-game exhibition trip to Italy and Switzerland, and early in the regular season defeated No. 14 Syracuse, but then staggered to a 15–18 finish. They failed to receive an invitation to either the NCAA tournament or the NIT for the first time since 2004 and only the second time since 1974.

During the 2016–17 season, Georgetown defeated three ranked teams—No. 13 Oregon, No. 16 Creighton, and No. 11 Butler—as well as their former Big East rivals Syracuse and Connecticut, but they finished ninth in the Big East with a 5–13 conference record—the most losses they had ever suffered in a season in either version of the Big East Conference—and lost to St. John's in the first round of the 2017 Big East tournament to finish 14–18. They missed both the NCAA tournament and the NIT for the second straight year, the first time they had missed the postseason in back-to-back seasons since 1974, and Thompson became the first Georgetown head coach to preside over consecutive losing seasons since John "Jack" Magee in 1970-71 and 1971-72. On March 23, 2017, Georgetown officials announced that Thompson had been fired.

Patrick Ewing era (2017–2023)

On April 3, 2017, Georgetown University announced that it had hired Patrick Ewing, the school's most decorated player, as its head coach. In his four years as a player at Georgetown, Ewing led the Hoyas to three Big East championships, three Final Fours, and the 1984 National Championship. Prior to taking over as the program's head coach, Ewing had spent the previous thirteen years as an assistant coach in the NBA, working for four different franchises under the tutelage of coaches such as Jeff Van Gundy, Stan Van Gundy, and Steve Clifford.

In 2017–18, Georgetown finished with a 15–15 record and 5–13 in the Big East. The Hoyas won the first eight games of Ewing's tenure, and finished their non-conference schedule with a 10–1 record, but struggled in conference play. The season ended with a 77–88 loss to St. John's in the first round of the Big East tournament. The team did not participate in any postseason tournament.

In Ewing's second season, the 2018–19 team finished 19–12 and 9–9 in the Big East, in a four-way tie for third place in the conference, their highest finish since 2015.  At the conclusion of the conference schedule, Jesse Govan was named First Team All-Big East, James Akinjo was named Big East Freshman of the Year, and Mac McClung and Josh LeBlanc were named to the All-Big East Freshman Team. The Hoyas lost their first game in the 2019 Big East tournament to Seton Hall 57–73.  They were selected to play in the 2019 NIT, their first postseason appearance since 2015, but dropped their first-round game 68–71 to Harvard.

The following season the 2019–20 Hoyas finished 15–17 and 5–13 in the Big East. In November, the team participated in the Empire Classic at Madison Square Garden in New York City where they beat No. 22 Texas 82–66, and moved to the final to face No. 1 Duke. Despite having a double digit lead in the first half vs Duke, the Hoyas ultimately fell 73–81. Playing with only 9 scholarship players following several defections and injuries, the Hoyas lost their final 7 games, including a 62–75 loss in the opening round of the 2020 Big East tournament to St. John's. All postseason tournaments were subsequently cancelled due to COVID-19.

The 2020–21 Hoyas finished the season 10–13 and 7–9 in the Big East. Before the season started, leading scorer Mac McClung announced his decision to transfer to Texas Tech. Because of COVID-19 protocols, the team played all of its home games on campus at McDonough Arena without fans. After a 69–74 loss at Syracuse, the team went on a 21-day pause due to COVID-19 protocols. After the hiatus, the team returned to win six of its next ten games. The Hoyas 7–9 record led to an 8th-place finish in the conference. At the 2021 Big East tournament, the team won its first tournament game under Ewing, with a 68–49 victory over Marquette in the opening round, then followed that up with wins against top-seeded Villanova and Seton Hall, sending them to the title game where they defeated Creighton 73–48 for their first title since 2007, and the eighth in school history, extending their own conference record.  The Hoyas earned a 12 seed in the NCAA tournament, where they lost their opening round game to Colorado 73–96.

The following season, the 2021–22 Hoyas were unable to build off their unlikely March run the prior season, and they suffered their worst season in school history. Georgetown lost all 19 conference games they played that season.  They also set a school record for most losses in a season with 25, finishing the year at 6-25.  The season ended with a 53-57 loss in the 2022 Big East tournament to Seton Hall.   Despite some rumblings about his job security, Ewing was retained by the university for the following season.

Despite some optimism with several high impact transfers brought in over the off-season, the 2022–23 Hoyas failed to improve off the prior year's low.  The team would lose its first 9 conference games, extending the record of consecutive conference game losses to 29, until they evantually beat DePaul 81-76 on January 24th, at the Capitol One Center.  The Hoyas would only win more game after this point and finished the year at 7–25, matching the program's high water mark for losses, just set the previous season.   The team lost in the 2023 Big East tournament 48–80 to Villanova. The following day, the university announced that Ewing would not return as coach, ending his six year run at his alma mater.   His Georgetown coaching career ended with a record of 75–109 (.408) and 28–81 (.257) in the Big East; both are the lowest winning percentages for a coach in the modern era of the program.

Ed Cooley era (2023–present)
On March 20, 2023, Ed Cooley accepted an offer to become the new head coach of the Georgetown Hoyas men's basketball team after 12 years in the same role at Providence College.

Awards and honors

Naismith Player of the Year Award
1985 - Patrick Ewing

Associated Press Player of the Year
1985 - Patrick Ewing

Most Outstanding Player of the NCAA tournament
1984 - Patrick Ewing

Big East Player of the Year
1980 - John Duren
1984 - Patrick Ewing
1985 - Patrick Ewing
1987 - Reggie Williams
1989 - Charles Smith
1992 - Alonzo Mourning
2007 - Jeff Green
2013 - Otto Porter

Big East Rookie of the Year
1981 - Fred Brown
1982 - Patrick Ewing
1993 - Othella Harrington
1995 - Allen Iverson
2005 - Jeff Green
2009 - Greg Monroe
2019 - James Akinjo

Big East Defensive Player of the Year
1982 - Patrick Ewing
1983 - Patrick Ewing
1984 - Patrick Ewing
1985 - Patrick Ewing
1989 - Alonzo Mourning
1990 - Alonzo Mourning & Dikembe Mutombo
1991 - Dikembe Mutombo
1992 - Alonzo Mourning
1996 - Allen Iverson

First Team All-American
1943 - John Mahnken
1982 - Eric "Sleepy" Floyd
1983 - Patrick Ewing
1984 - Patrick Ewing
1985 - Patrick Ewing
1987 - Reggie Williams
1992 - Alonzo Mourning
1996 - Allen Iverson
2013 - Otto Porter

Second Team All-American
1947 - Dan Kraus
1981 - Eric "Sleepy" Floyd
1982 - Patrick Ewing
1989 - Charles Smith
1990 - Alonzo Mourning
2008 - Roy Hibbert

Third Team All-American
1989 - Alonzo Mourning
1991 - Dikembe Mutombo
2007 - Jeff Green
2010 - Greg Monroe

Honorable Mention All-American
1934 - Ed Hargaden
1955 - Warren Buehler
1963 - Jim Barry
1980 - John Duren & Craig Shelton
1985 - Bill Martin
1986 - Reggie Williams
1988 - Perry McDonald
1990 - Mark Tillmon & Dikembe Mutombo
1995 - Allen Iverson
1997 - Victor Page
2003 - Mike Sweetney
2011 - Austin Freeman

National Coach of the Year
1982 -  John Thompson
1985 - John Thompson
1987 - John Thompson

Big East Coach of the Year
1980 - John Thompson
1987 - John Thompson
1992 - John Thompson
2013 - John Thompson III

Season-by-season results

Conference Championships: 11
 Eastern Intercollegiate Conference (1932-1939): 1
 Big East Conference (1979–2013): 10
 Big East Conference (2013–): 0
Conference tournament championships: 11
 ECAC Regional Tournaments: 3
 Big East Conference (1979–2013): 7
 Big East Conference (2013–): 1
NCAA Tournament
 Appearances: 31
 Final Four appearances: 5
 National runners-up: 3
 National championships: 1
 Overall record: 47–30
National Invitation Tournament
 Appearances: 13
 Runners-up: 2
 Championships: 0
 Overall record: 15–14

Postseason history

NCAA tournament seeds
The NCAA began seeding the tournament with the 1979 edition.

NCAA tournament results
The Hoyas have made 31 appearances in the NCAA Division I men's basketball tournament. They have a record of 47–30.

NIT results
The Hoyas have gone to the National Invitation Tournament 13 times. They have a record of 15–14.

Coaches

 No coach (1906–1907) – student manager Lou Murray ran the team
 Maurice Joyce (1907–1911)
 James Colliflower (1911–1914, 1921–1922)
 John D. O'Reilly (1914–1921, 1923–1927)
 Jock Maloney (1922–1923)
 Elmer Ripley (1927–1929, 1938–1943, 1946–1949)
 Bill Dudak (1929–1930)
 John T. Colrick (1930–1931)
 Fred Mesmer (1931–1938)
 Program suspended (1943–1945) due to World War II
 Ken Engles (1945–1946)
 Buddy O'Grady (1949–1952)
 Buddy Jeannette (1952–1956)
 Tommy Nolan (1956–1960)
 Tommy O'Keefe (1960–1966)
 Jack Magee (1966–1972)
 John Thompson Jr. (1972–1999)
 Craig Esherick (1999–2004)
 John Thompson III (2004–2017)
 Patrick Ewing (2017–2023)
 Ed Cooley (2023-present)

Traditions

Rivalries

Syracuse University

Georgetown's biggest rival is Syracuse.  The two schools have been playing each other since 1930, but their rivalry was solidified in the 1980s as the respective programs were the leading powers during the infancy of the newly formed Big East conference. In 1980, the first season of new conference, Georgetown famously ended Syracuse's 57-game home winning streak in the final game to be played at Manley Field House before moving to the Carrier Dome.  After the win, Georgetown coach John Thompson declared, "Manley Field House is officially closed".   Weeks later, the two schools met in the inaugural Big East Championship, with Georgetown prevailing 87–81.  The teams met in four Big East tournament championship games during the 1980s, with Georgetown winning all four contests.

The animosity between the programs was further extended when Syracuse announced their decision to leave the Big East effective in 2013 to join the ACC, forcing the split of "Catholic Seven" and the football-playing schools.  This led to the creation of the reformed Big East Conference and the American Athletic Conference.  However, Georgetown and Syracuse have continued to play each other in all but one of the years following their exit from the conference.  The rivalry is currently renewed through the 2022–23 season.

Villanova University

As a fellow Catholic institution and conference foe, Villanova has been a natural rival for the Hoyas for many years.  The schools are arguably two of the most successful programs among the group of teams that currently make up the Big East Conference.  The rivalry is best known for the 1985 NCAA Championship Game where No. 8-seeded Villanova shocked the highly favored and top-ranked Hoyas 66–64, preventing Georgetown from winning back-to-back titles.

Among current Big East Conference foes, Villanova has the most Final Four appearances (6) in the Big East.

St. John's University

Having first played each other in 1909, St. John's is one of Georgetown's oldest rivals.  The two teams played off and on since that first contest until 1965, when they began annually scheduled games, and they only intensified when both programs became founding members of the Big East Conference in 1979. The rivalry was brought to national attention during the 1984-85 NCAA Division I men's basketball season when both programs were ranked No. 1 and No. 2 throughout the season and met on a total of four occasions, including the famous "Sweater Game" at Madison Square Garden, the 1985 Big East Championship, and the 1985 Final Four.  The Hoyas won 3 of the 4 matchups that year.

The rivalry gained renewed interest when both schools remained in the new Big East Conference following the many iterations of conference alignment.

University of Connecticut

An original member of the Big East, UConn and Georgetown battled for conference supremacy for multiple decades, until UConn left the conference to join the American Athletic Conference in 2013.  One of the most intense periods for the rivalry was the 1995-1996 season where both teams found themselves ranked in the Top 5 throughout most of the year, led by stars Allen Iverson and Ray Allen respectively.  During the regular season, Georgetown upset then ranked No. 3 UConn in Washington DC, but a few weeks later at Madison Square Garden, UConn prevailed in a classic Big East tournament Final 75–74, on a last second shot by Allen.

UConn is the only team to match Georgetown's record of 10 regular season titles and is second behind the Hoyas in total conference tournament titles. The schools continued to play each other in their non-conference schedule, and have renewed their rivalry now that UConn has returned to the league in 2020.

Blue and gray

Georgetown's official colors are blue and gray. The colors were selected in 1876 by the Georgetown College Boat Club (the original crew team) in honor of Georgetown students and alumni who wore the Union blue and Confederate gray in the Civil War.  A student committee declared blue and gray "as appropriate colors for the Boat Club and expressive of the feeling of unity between the Northern and Southern boys of the College", and recommended its adoption for the team.  By the time the men's varsity basketball team was formed, the blue and gray colors were already widely adopted by the school.

Presently, Georgetown is one of the few teams to wear gray as their primary home uniform color, as traditionally teams wear white uniforms at home (though the Hoyas do have a white alternate jersey that is worn on occasion).  Fans are generally encouraged to wear gray to home games, and sellouts are referred to as a "gray out."

Kenner League
Each summer Georgetown University's McDonough Gymnasium hosts the Kenner League.  Named after one of the founders and first director of the Metropolitan Police Boys' and Girls' Club of Washington DC, the Kenner league is the only NCAA sanctioned summer league in Washington, D.C.  Formed in 1982, the league allows Georgetown players to continue their development in an NCAA-structured environment, and to stay within view of watchful eyes on a college campus (even if the coaches were not allowed there by NCAA rules). From its humble beginnings, the Kenner legacy continued to build throughout the 1980s, with coverage in The Washington Post beginning around 1986, then a high school bracket following soon thereafter, and ultimately the arrival of "senior" teams featuring a mix of former Georgetown players, visiting NBA stars, and local hoop legends.

Kenner continued to grow, with more fans making the trip weekly to the gymnasium for a series of weeknight and weekend games each summer. As new recruits arrived at Georgetown, following them at the Kenner League became a priority for fans.  Many fans might think Georgetown runs the Kenner League, but it does not. The league is an independent effort, whose organizers must raise money from Nike and team sponsors to cover the cost of officials, jerseys, and other organizational costs, and maintain NCAA certification. As summer leagues go, Kenner is among the longest running of its kind.  Since the league has been in existence, nearly 200 Georgetown players have played in the Kenner League.  After nearly a two year break due to COVID-19, Kenner League returned in the summer of 2022.

Alumni

The Hoyas have an excellent history of preparing players for the NBA. Two Hoyas were the NBA first overall draft picks: Patrick Ewing in 1985 and Allen Iverson in 1996. Alonzo Mourning was the second overall pick in the 1992 draft. Dikembe Mutombo also was drafted in the first round, 4th overall Other alumni have gone undrafted, but entered the NBA later, such as Jaren Jackson in 1989 and Henry Sims and Chris Wright in 2013.

Several Hoya basketball players are famous purely for their off-court accomplishments. Brendan Gaughan, who walked onto the basketball squad, is a driver in NASCAR's Truck Series and also raced one season in the Cup Series.  James L. Jones, who played for the Hoyas in the mid-1960s before joining the Marine Corps, went on to become Commandant of the Marine Corps, Supreme Allied Commander Europe, and President Obama's National Security Advisor. Paul Tagliabue, who played in the early 1960s and was one of the leading rebounders in school history, became Commissioner of the National Football League from 1989 to 2006 and later served as Georgetown's Chairman of the board of directors. Henry Hyde, who led Georgetown to its first national final, was elected a member of Congress from Illinois and Chairman of House Judiciary Committee. He received the nation's highest civilian honor, the Medal of Freedom. William Shea, who played in the 1920s, was the New York attorney who brought the New York Mets to the city. Shea Stadium, now demolished and replaced on-site by the Mets' current home of Citi Field, was named in his honor.

NBA draft picks

Basketball Hall of Fame inductees
 Elmer Ripley (coach) - inducted in 1973
 Buddy Jeannette (coach) - inducted in 1994 (as a player)
 John Thompson (coach) - inducted in 1999
 Patrick Ewing - inducted in 2008
 Alonzo Mourning - inducted in 2014
 Dikembe Mutombo - inducted in 2015
 Allen Iverson - inducted in 2016

See also
 Big East Conference
Georgetown Hoyas women's basketball
Georgetown Hoyas

Notes

References

External links

 

 
1906 establishments in Washington, D.C.
Basketball teams established in 1906